William Whatley (12 October 1912 - December 1974) was a professional footballer who played for Tottenham Hotspur and was also a Welsh international footballer during the latter part of the 1930s.

Career 
Bill Whatley joined Tottenham Hotspur from Ebbw Vale as an amateur on 31 December 1929.  During his early days at Spurs he played for Barnet F.C. on occasion alongside other young Welsh Tottenham players, Taffy O'Callaghan and Ron Burgess, before making his debut for the first team in 1932. Playing as full-back he made 254 appearances scoring two goals during his career, which was interrupted by the start of the Second World War in 1939. During the latter part of his playing career in 1938 he was in competition for his first team place with Bill Nicholson.

He played for Wales against England in the 1938 British Home Championship when the Welsh won 4 - 2 at Ninian Park. Later the same year he played alongside fellow Spurs player Ron Burgess and after war broke out in a 'Wartime International' match, again against England in a match which was drawn 1 - 1. He also won representative honours whilst with the Forces.

After retiring as a player he continued as a coach and scout for Tottenham. After leaving  Spurs he went on to manage Gravesend and Northfleet.

References 

1912 births
Association football defenders
Welsh footballers
Wales international footballers
Tottenham Hotspur F.C. players
1974 deaths
Ebbw Vale F.C. players
Barnet F.C. players
English Football League players
Tottenham Hotspur F.C. non-playing staff